The Fields Open in Hawaii was a golf tournament for professional female golfers, played on the LPGA Tour. It was held from 2006 and 2008 at the Ko Olina Resort in Kapolei, an incorporated community within the city of Honolulu, Hawaii.

The tournament title sponsor was the Fields Corporation, a Japanese-based designer and manufacturer of game machines, such as Pachinko.  The tournament was discontinued after the 2008 season due to sponsorship issues.

Winners

Tournament record

References

External links
LPGA official microsite

Former LPGA Tour events
Golf in Hawaii
Sports in Honolulu
Recurring sporting events established in 2006
Recurring sporting events disestablished in 2008
2006 establishments in Hawaii
2008 disestablishments in Hawaii
History of women in Hawaii